Isabel de Clare may refer to:

 Isabel de Clare, 4th Countess of Pembroke (1172–1220)
 Isabella of Gloucester and Hertford (1226-1264)